Sopuruchukwu Bruno Onyemaechi  (born 3 April 1999) is a Nigerian footballer who plays as a defender for Portuguese club Boavista on loan from Feirense.

Club career
On 17 August 2022, Onyemaechi joined Boavista on a season-long loan with an option to buy.

Career statistics

Club

Notes

References

1999 births
People from Owerri
Sportspeople from Imo State
Living people
Nigerian footballers
Association football midfielders
C.D. Feirense players
S.C. Vila Real players
Boavista F.C. players
Campeonato de Portugal (league) players
Liga Portugal 2 players
Primeira Liga players
Nigerian expatriate footballers
Nigerian expatriate sportspeople in Portugal
Expatriate footballers in Portugal